Benjamin Galstaun (Klakah 1913–1989) received the Ramon Magsaysay Awards 1977 for his work in promoting the appreciation of animals and nature.

References 

Ramon Magsaysay Award winners
Indonesian environmentalists
1913 births
1989 deaths